Holy Trinity Church, Leamington Spa is a Grade II listed parish church in Leamington Spa, England.

History 

Holy Trinity Church was started in 1825 as a daughter church of All Saints' Church and opened in 1847. It was designed by Mitchell of Leamington Spa, to the commission of Revd John Craig, vicar of All Saints.

It was enlarged in 1865, and more work took place in 1881 when the transepts were enlarged and a vestry was provided by John Cundall.

A parish was formed in 1899.
 
The porch and east chancel wall date from 1900, and there were further alterations just before the First World War.

Organ

The church has a large four-manual pipe organ which dates from 1880. Originally by Forster and Andrews the organ has been rebuilt and restored many times. A specification of the organ can be found on the National Pipe Organ Register.

Organists

1939 - 1949 Stanley Vann 
Martindale Sidwell temporary organist during the war
1949 - 1956 Harold Dexter
1956 - 1957 Peter Hurford
John Cooper
Frank Antony Ernest Randle
Adrian Moore
2021–present Kerry Beaumont

External links
 Website www.holytrinityleamington.org.uk

References

Gothic Revival church buildings in England
Leamington, Holy Trinity
Leamington, Holy Trinity
Buildings and structures in Leamington Spa
Leamington, Holy Trinity